Baghdad is the capital of Iraq.

Baghdad may also refer to:

Places

In Iraq 
Baghdad Governorate, the region encompassing the city and its surrounding areas
Baghdad Province, Ottoman Empire
Baghdad Central Station, a train station
Baghdad International Airport
Round city of Baghdad
University of Baghdad
Baghdad College, a boys' high school
Baghdad (West Syriac Diocese) (9th–13th centuries)

Elsewhere
Baghdād, Afghanistan
Baghdad, Iran
Baghdad, Pakistan
Bagdad, Tasmania, Australia
Lake Baghdad, Rottnest Island, Western Australia
Baghdad Stadium, Kwekwe, Zimbabwe
Baghdad Street (Damascus), Syria
Baghdad Street (Singapore)
Bağdat Avenue, Istanbul, Turkey

Other uses
Baghdad (EP), by The Offspring
Baghdad Satellite Channel, a television network
Baghdad Soft Drinks Co
Roman Catholic Archdiocese of Baghdad, Iraq
7079 Baghdad, an asteroid
Sophiane Baghdad (born 1980), French-Algerian football player

See also
Bagdad (disambiguation)
Baghdadi (disambiguation)